Olurotimi or Oluwarotimi is a Yoruba name meaning "God stays with me" 

Olarotimi means "Wealth stays with me" 

People with the name include:
Oluwarotimi Odunayo Akeredolu (born 1956), Nigerian politician
Joseph Olurotimi Sanya, Nigerian doctor 
Rotimi (actor) (Olurotimi Akinosho), American singer-songwriter, actor and model

See also
Rotimi

Yoruba given names